Dobara Phir Se is a 2016 Pakistani romantic drama film directed by Mehreen Jabbar, written by Bilal Sami and a production of ARY Films. The film is produced by Salman Iqbal and co-produced by Mohammad Jerjees Seja. The film stars Ali Kazmi, Hareem Farooq, Adeel Hussain, Tooba Siddiqui, Sanam Saeed, Atiqa Odho, Shaz Khan, and child actor, Musa Khan. The film was released on 25 November 2016.

Plot
Film's story revolves around a character of a divorced Pakistani woman based in New York City who meets an ambitious Hammad (Adeel Hussain). The film explores their relationship and eventual challenges as they begin to grow feelings for one another.

Cast

 Adeel Hussain as Hammad Farooqui
 Sanam Saeed as Samar
 Hareem Farooq as Zainab Rehman
 Ali Kazmi as Vassay
 Tooba Siddiqui as Natasha
 Atiqa Odho as Ammi
 Shaz Khan as Asim
 Sonia Rehman as Api
 Shamim Hilaly as Maa Ji
 Musa Khan as Zaid
James Koroni as Choreographer
Michelle Sohn as Young mother

Production
The director announced film title in July 2015 that she is about to start this project soon. The film is produced by distribution company ARY Films. The director revealed film's cast and crew on 18 August 2015 in her tweet.

Filming
Film shooting began on 23 August in New York City. On 28 August, a scene was short over Bridge Street Bridge. In the last week of August, scenes were shot at Jennings Beach and Lake Mohegan. First spell of film ended in New York at end of September's first week.

Release
The film is released in Pakistan across the Country on 25 November 2016.

Accolades

Soundtrack
 "Dobara Phir Se" - Haniya Aslam, Ali Hamza
 "Lar Gaiyaan" - Zarish Hafeez, Shiraz Uppal
 "Khamoshi" - Jimmy Khan
 "Rasta Tham Gaya" - Rekha Bhardwaj
 "Raske Bhare Tore Nain" - Arooj Aftab
 "Hone Do" - Jimmy Khan, Sara Haider
 "Wo Kaisi Ho Gee" - Jimmy Khan

See also
 List of Pakistani films of 2016

References

External links 

 

2010s Urdu-language films
Films shot in New York City
Mehreen Jabbar's directions
Pakistani romantic drama films
2016 romantic drama films
Films shot in Karachi
Films set in New York City